Alexandre Navarro is guitarist, sound maker and independent producer from Bordeaux and now living in Paris. Considered as "french master minimalist composer" He studied electroacoustic music, concrete music and electronic music at Conservatoire à rayonnement régional de Bordeaux under the guidance of composer Christian Eloy and Octandre French association. After 7 years of running labels, Alexandre Navarro decided in 2014 to concentrate on his own works.
Alexandre Navarro has launched a new label in 2019 called "Les disques imaginations".

Recordings 

 2004 – Please, Sit Down (Realaudio)
 2005 – Future Nature (Realaudio)
 2005 – Medium (Archipel)
 2006 – Eko Std. (Standard Klik Music)
 2006 – Dimension (Standard Klik Music)
 2006 – Ame (Archipel)
 2007 – 1001 (Mandorla)
 2008 – Arcane (Sem label) nomination Qwartz Awards 2009 "Search" section
 2011 – Loka (Sem label)
 2012 – Elements (Sem label)
 2012 – Cycles (Laverna)
 2012 – Sketches (Constellation Tatsu)
 2013 – Hozho (Sem label)
 2013 – Lost Cities (Dronarivm)
 2013 – Redfish (Sem label)
 2014 – La Danse Des Substances (Disq An)
 2015 – Daimon (self-released)
 2016 – Routes (self-released)
 2017 – Anti-matière (Archipel)
 2018 – Imaginations (self-released)
 2019 – Pneuma (self-released)
 2019 – Le liens magnétiques (self-released)
 2020 – Distil (Microrama)
 2020 - 26 impressions de l’âme (self-released)
 2022 - Onde salée (Disq An)

Collaborations 

 2000, Music for Futura, festival international d'art acousmatique et des arts de support
 2001, 2002, 2003 – Exhibition " Less and More " Frédéric Druot Architecte – Ministère de la Culture
 2004, Arborescence Exhibition " Creative Commons project " w/ Baptiste Houssin
 2014, Mutant Area Exhibition
 2016, Additional score of the short movie "Traveller" directed by James Latter
 2018, Score of the short movie "Everything is Upstream" directed by Martin Ponferrada

Awards 

 2018, Music Award of Excellence "Southern Shorts" Awards – 2017 – Score for short movie Everything is Upstream by Martin Ponferrada

References

External links 
 
 Discography, discogs.com

1974 births
Place of birth missing (living people)
French guitarists
French male guitarists
Living people
21st-century guitarists
21st-century French male musicians